The Nawab of Awadh or the Nawab of Oudh  was the title of the rulers who governed the state of Awadh (anglicised as Oudh) in north India during the 18th and 19th centuries. The Nawabs of Awadh belonged to an Iranian dynasty of Sayyid origin from Nishapur, Iran. In 1724, Nawab Sa'adat Khan established the Oudh State with their capital in Faizabad and Lucknow.

History

The Nawabs of Awadh were semi-autonomous rulers within the fragmented polities of Mughal India after the death in 1707 of Aurangzeb. They fought wars with the Peshwa, the Battle of Bhopal (1737) against the Maratha Confederacy (which was opposed to the Mughal Empire), and the Battle of Karnal (1739) as courtiers of the "Great Moghul".

The Nawabs of Awadh, along with many other Nawabs, were regarded as members of the nobility of the greater Mughal Empire. They joined Ahmad Shah Durrani during the Third Battle of Panipat (1761) and restored Shah Alam II ( and 1788–1806) to the imperial throne. The Nawab of Awadh also fought the Battle of Buxar (1764) preserving the interests of the Moghul. Oudh State eventually declared itself independent from the rule of the "Great Moghul" in 1818.

List of rulers
All of these rulers used the title of Nawab from 1722 to 1856:

Gallery

See also

 Begum Hazrat Mahal
 List of Shia dynasties
 The Chess Players (film)

References

Further reading
 Ashirbadi Lal Srivastava (1899-1973): The First Two Nawabs of Awadh. A critical study based on original sources. With a foreword by Sir Jadunath Sarkar. Lucknow : The Upper India Publishing House 1933. xi, 301 S. - Originally Phil. Diss. Lucknow 1932. 2. rev. and corr. ed. Agra : Shiv Lal Agarwal 1954. - About Burhan ul Mulk Sa'adat Khan (1680-1739) and Safdar Jang (1708-1754), Nawabs of Awadh
 Ashirbadi Lal Srivastava (1899-1973): Shuja-ud-Daulah. Vol. I (1754-1765). Calcutta : Sarkar Midland Press 1939 - A thesis approved for the degree of doctor of letters by the Agra University in 1938. 2., rev. and corr. ed. Agra : Shiva Lal Agarwala 1961. - Vol. II (1765-1775) Lahore : Minerva 1945. 2. ed. Agra : Agarwal 1974. - About Shuja-ud-Daula (1732-1775), Nawab of Awadh

External links
 Nawabs of Awadh
 THE COURT LIFE UNDER THE NAWABS OF AWADH (1754–1797)
 Roots of North Indian Shi‘ism in Iran and Iraq:Religion and State in Awadh, 1722–1859, by J. R. I. Cole. University of California Press, 1989.
 HISTORICAL SERIES No. LVI
 Advanced study in the history of modern India, Volume 2, by G. S. Chhabra, Lotus Press, 1 January 2005

Awadh
History of Uttar Pradesh
History of Awadh
Nawabs of Awadh
Shia dynasties
Iranian Muslim dynasties
Mughal Empire
1772 establishments in India
1858 disestablishments in India